Naughty or Nice is an American television film starring George Lopez and James Kirk.  It premiered on ABC in 2004. As of 2009, it was shown in the 25 Days of Christmas programming block on ABC Family, but it was not part of the block in 2010.

Plot
A Chicago sports radio shock jock is changed by a Christmas season encounter with a 15-year-old fan who is dying of a heart condition, who forces him to be nice for a day.

Cast
George Lopez as Henry Ramiro
James Kirk as Michael
Lisa Vidal as Diana Ramiro
Bianca Collins as Olivia Ramiro
Daniel MacLean as Kevin Gilmore

See also 
 List of Christmas films

External links
 

2004 television films
2004 films
American Christmas films
Films directed by Eric Laneuville
Christmas television films
2000s Christmas films
2000s English-language films